Roberto Gleria (also Robert), born 15 October 1968, is a former freestyle swimmer from Italy.

Gleria swam for Australia in the mid-1980s and was an Australian Institute of Sport scholarship holder before taking up on an offer to swim for Italy leading up to the 1988 Seoul Olympic Games. He competed at the 1986 Commonwealth Games for Australia, winning gold medals in both the 200 metre freestyle and the 4×200 metre freestyle relay.

Gleria competed for Italy at the 1988 Summer Olympic Games in Seoul, South Korea, in both the 100, 200 and 400
metre freestyle, finishing first in the B Final of the 200 metre freestyle in a time of 1 minute 49.28 seconds. He also contributed to all three of Italy's relay teams.

He also competed at the 1992 Summer Olympic Games in Barcelona, Spain, in the 100 and 200 metre freestyles and both freestyle relays.

See also
 List of Commonwealth Games medallists in swimming (men)

References

Italian male freestyle swimmers
Australian male freestyle swimmers
Olympic swimmers of Italy
Commonwealth Games gold medallists for Australia
Swimmers at the 1986 Commonwealth Games
Swimmers at the 1988 Summer Olympics
Swimmers at the 1992 Summer Olympics
Living people
World Aquatics Championships medalists in swimming
Australian Institute of Sport swimmers
European Aquatics Championships medalists in swimming
Commonwealth Games medallists in swimming
Mediterranean Games gold medalists for Italy
Swimmers at the 1991 Mediterranean Games
Australian people of Italian descent
Mediterranean Games medalists in swimming
Year of birth missing (living people)
Medallists at the 1986 Commonwealth Games